House at 332 Franklin Avenue is a historic home located at Sea Cliff in Nassau County, New York.  It was built in 1888 and is a large two story clapboard and shingled house with a hipped roof in the Queen Anne style.  It features a shed roofed wraparound porch on square posts and four tapered chimneys.

It was listed on the National Register of Historic Places in 1988.

References

Houses on the National Register of Historic Places in New York (state)
Queen Anne architecture in New York (state)
Houses completed in 1888
Houses in Nassau County, New York
National Register of Historic Places in Nassau County, New York